Anna Catherine Gilbert (born 1972) is an American mathematician who works as the Herman Goldstine Collegiate Professor of Mathematics at the University of Michigan. She also holds a courtesy appointment in electrical engineering and computer science at Michigan. Her research expertise is in randomized algorithms for harmonic analysis, image processing, signal processing, and large data sets.

Education and career
Gilbert earned a bachelor's degree from the University of Chicago in 1993, and completed her Ph.D. in 1997 from Princeton University under the supervision of Ingrid Daubechies. After postdoctoral research at Yale University, she joined AT&T Labs, and continued there as a staff member until 2004, when she moved to Michigan.

Research
Gilbert's research discoveries have included the existence of multifractal behavior in TCP-based internet traffic, the development of streaming algorithms based on random projections for aggregating information from large data streams using very small amounts of working memory, and a foundational analysis of the ability of orthogonal matching pursuit to recover sparse signals with her student Joel Tropp.

Recognition
She became a Sloan Fellow in 2006. In 2008, she was awarded the NAS Award for Initiatives in Research  and the Association for Computing Machinery Douglas Engelbart Award. In 2013 she won the Ralph E. Kleinman Prize of the Society for Industrial and Applied Mathematics "for her creative and deep contributions to the mathematics of signal processing, data analysis and communications". She was an invited speaker at the International Congress of Mathematicians in 2014, speaking on "Mathematics in Science and Technology". She gave the von Neuman Lecture at the 2022 Joint Mathematics Meeting, titled "Metric representations: Algorithms and Geometry."

References

1972 births
Living people
20th-century American mathematicians
21st-century American mathematicians
American computer scientists
American women mathematicians
American women computer scientists
University of Chicago alumni
Princeton University alumni
University of Michigan faculty
20th-century women mathematicians
21st-century women mathematicians
20th-century American women
21st-century American women